Juan Soberanes Ramos (born June 24, 1968 in Culiacán) is a Mexican professional boxer. He's also the former WBA Fedecentro Light Welterweight Champion.

Professional career
Juan won Mexican National lightweight title, when he beat Juan Guardado in Tijuana.

IBC Lightweight title
In 1991, he lost his first shot at a world title against International Boxing Council (IBC) Lightweight Champion Jaime Balboa.

WBA Fedecentro Light Welterweight title
In August 1997, he won the WBA Fedecentro Light Welterweight title by upsetting title contender Jose Rodriguez.

On December 2, 1996 Ramos lost to three-time world champion, Antonio Margarito in El Gran Mercado, Phoenix, Arizona.

References

External links

Boxers from Sinaloa
Sportspeople from Culiacán
Lightweight boxers
Welterweight boxers
Light-welterweight boxers
1968 births
Living people
Mexican male boxers